Huang Cheng (born 1982) is a Chinese paralympic rower. He won the gold medal at the 14th Summer Paralympics at London. He defeated Erik Horrie and Aleksey Chuvashev to clinch gold in the men's single sculls.

References

1982 births
Paralympic gold medalists for China
Living people
Medalists at the 2012 Summer Paralympics
Rowers at the 2012 Summer Paralympics
Paralympic medalists in rowing
Paralympic rowers of China